Moerewa railway station was a station at Moerewa on the Opua Branch of the North Auckland Line in New Zealand.

References

Defunct railway stations in New Zealand